Road is a 2014 BBC documentary film narrated by Liam Neeson about the Dunlop family from Northern Ireland who dominated motorcycle road racing for twenty years. Northern Ireland and the Isle of Man are almost unique in holding motorcycle races on (closed) public roads. 

The film follows the racing careers of Joey Dunlop (1952–2000), who won five consecutive TT Formula One world titles and his brother Robert Dunlop (1960–2008), whose sons Michael (born 1988) and William (1985–2018) were successful road racers.

Joey Dunlop was notable off-track for his humanitarian work among orphanages in the Balkans. He was killed during a race in Tallinn, Estonia, when his bike left the track and crashed into a tree.
Robert Dunlop suffered multiple injuries after his rear wheel collapsed during the 1994 Formula One TT, but after two years' rehabilitation returned to racing in the Super Lightweight class on a bike specially modified to accommodate his damaged leg and wrist. He died during a practice lap before the 2008 North West 200.

The film comes to a climax when Michael, a legitimate entry to the 250cc race of that competition, but against the strong wishes of the organisers, forced his way onto the starting grid on 17 May 2008, two days after the death of his father and the day before the funeral, and won the race.

The film includes footage from
North West 200
Isle of Man TT
Ulster Grand Prix
Cookstown 100 Road Races
Skerries Road Races
Armoy Road Races
Killalane Road Races
Manx Grand Prix, Isle  of Man

Reception
Simon Kinnear, in Total Film gave the film four stars, and is quoted as saying "[Road] does for the sport what Senna did for Formula One"

Home media
Madman Entertainment released a DVD of the film in Australia.

References 

2014 documentary films
Documentary films about auto racing
British auto racing films
British sports documentary films
BBC television documentaries